Abdul Rashid Kabuli (born 15 August 1936) was a politician from the Indian state of Jammu and Kashmir, who belonged to the National Conference political party, and twice served as the Member of Parliament from Srinagar Lok Sabha constituency.

External links

India MPs 1980–1984
India MPs 1984–1989
Politicians from Srinagar
Indian Muslims
Jammu & Kashmir National Conference politicians
Kashmiri people
Lok Sabha members from Jammu and Kashmir
1936 births
Living people
People from Kabul